The 3 arrondissements of the Gers department are:
 Arrondissement of Auch, (prefecture of the Gers department: Auch) with 134 communes.  The population of the arrondissement was 81,242 in 2016.  
 Arrondissement of Condom, (subprefecture: Condom) with 162 communes.  The population of the arrondissement was 67,137 in 2016.  
 Arrondissement of Mirande, (subprefecture: Mirande) with 165 communes. The population of the arrondissement was 42,285 in 2016.

History

In 1800 the arrondissements of Auch, Condom, Lectoure, Lombez and Mirande were established. The arrondissements of Lectoure and Lombez were disbanded in 1926. 

The borders of the arrondissements of Gers were modified in January 2017:
 13 communes from the arrondissement of Auch to the arrondissement of Condom
 21 communes from the arrondissement of Auch to the arrondissement of Mirande
 nine communes from the arrondissement of Condom to the arrondissement of Auch
 five communes from the arrondissement of Mirande to the arrondissement of Auch

References

Gers